Stade Louis-Michel is a multi-purpose stadium in Sète, France. It is currently used mostly for football matches and is the home stadium of FC Sète 34. The stadium is able to hold 8,500 people.

References

Louis Michel
FC Sète 34
Sports venues in Hérault
Sports venues completed in 1990